is a Jōdo-shū Buddhist temple in Tokyo, Japan. It is the main temple of the Jōdo-shū ("Pure Land") Chinzei sect of Buddhism in the Kantō region,. Its mountain name is San'en-zan  (三縁山).

Zōjō-ji is notable for its relationship with the Tokugawa clan, the rulers of Japan during the Edo period, with six of the Tokugawa shōguns being buried in the Taitoku-in Mausoleum in the temple grounds. Also, the temple's Sangedatsumon (main gate) is the oldest wooden building in Tokyo, dating from 1622. The original buildings, temples, mausoleums and the cathedral were destroyed by fire, natural disasters or air raids during World War II.

It is located in the Shiba neighborhood of Minato. The Shiba Park is built around the temple, with the Tokyo Tower standing beside it. In 2015 a Treasure Gallery was opened on the underground level of the Daiden (great hall), and it currently houses paintings of Kanō Kazunobu and a model of the Taitoku-in Mausoleum.

The temple remains active "as the main temple of Jodo shu and the central nembutsu seminary for priests and novices."

History 

Shūei (宗叡, 809-884), a disciple of Kūkai, founded a temple named Kōmyō-ji (光明寺) at Kaizuka (貝塚, present-day Kōjimachi in Chiyoda, Tokyo); it is said to have been the forerunner of Zōjō-ji. In 1393, during the Muromachi period, the temple, under its abbot Yūyo Shōsō,  converted from Shingon to the Jōdo school. Shōsō is thus regarded as the founder of Zōjō-ji.

Together with Kan'ei-ji, during the Edo period Zōjō-ji was the Tokugawa's family temple. Tokugawa Ieyasu had the temple moved, first to Hibiya, then in 1590, at the time of expansion of Edo Castle, to its present location.

With the fall of the Tokugawa shogunate, the grounds took on the character of a public park. The temple was badly damaged in World War II, but still retains the air of a major temple.

Architecture 

At its peak the temple grounds had more than 120 buildings, but following the decline of Buddhism during the Meiji period (1868-1912), most of them burned during the Bombing of Tokyo in World War II. Reconstruction began after the war, with the Daiden (great hall) being rebuilt in 1974.

Sangedatsumon 

The 21 meter (69 foot) two-storied main gate,  was constructed in 1622, and it is therefore the oldest wooden building in Tokyo. The temple's only original structure to survive the Second World War, it has been designated an Important Cultural Property.

"San" (三) means "three", and "Gedatsu" (解脱) means "Moksha". If someone passes through the gate, he can free himself from three passions (貪 Ton; "greed", 瞋 Shin; "hatred", 癡 Chi; "foolishness").

On the upper floor are enshrined an image of Gautama Buddha flanked by two attendants, and statues of the Sixteen Arhats.

Mausoleum of Tokugawa Shōguns 

Six of the 15 Tokugawa shōguns are buried at Zōjō-ji. The Taitoku-in Mausoleum of Hidetada (and the monument to his wife Sūgen'in), Ienobu, and Ietsugu had been designated National Treasures of Japan, but were burned in World War II. At present, parts of two of their graves have the distinction of being Important Cultural Properties of Japan. Additional graves are located in the cemetery behind the Great Hall. Parts of the former grounds of the temple are now occupied by a park and two hotels. Tokugawa Iemochi also Iemochi's wife, Kazu-no-Miya Chikako also buried in Zozo-ji.

Sentai Kosodate Jizō (Unborn Children Garden) 

In one particular garden at the cemetery, rows of stone statues of children represent unborn children, including miscarried, aborted, and stillborn children. Parents can choose a statue in the garden and decorate it with small clothing and toys. Usually the statues are accompanied by a small gift for Jizō, the guardian of unborn children, to ensure that they are brought to the afterlife. Occasionally stones are piled by the statue; this is meant to ease the journey to the afterlife.

Other structures 

 Daiden (Great Hall) 1974
 Ankokuden
 Sutra Repository
 Treasures Gallery
 Bell tower
 Enko Daishi Hall
 Koshoden

Access 

There is no admission fee for visitors to enter the temple complex. For the Treasure Gallery museum the access fee is (700 yen).

The entrance is at a 10-minute walk from Hamamatsucho Station on the JR Yamanote and Keihin-Tōhoku Lines, a 6-minute walk from Daimon Station on the Toei Asakusa and Toei Oedo Lines, a 3-minute walk from Onarimon and Shibakoen Stations on the Toei Mita Line, and about 500 meters from the Shibakoen exit of the Shuto Expressway.

While not immediately obvious, the temple grounds are somewhat wheelchair-accessible if entering from the side street instead of the main gate.

Annual events 

 Hatsumōde (New Year's visit) January
 Kurohonzon Prayer Ceremony, 15 January
 Setsubun Tsuina-shiki / Nehan Ceremony (Nirvana Day) February
 Spring Higan Ceremony, March
 Gyoki Ceremony / Buddha's Birthday (Flower Festival) April
 Kurohonzon Prayer Ceremony, 15 May
 O-bon / Kaisan-ki / Bon Odori, July
 Peace Prayer Ceremony, August
 Autumn Higan Ceremony / Takigi Noh, September
 Kurohonzon Prayer Ceremony, 15 September
 Juya Hoyo (Ten Nights of Prayer) November
 Jodo Ceremony (Bodhi Day) / Butsumyo Ceremony / Joya no Kane (New Year's Eve Bell Ringing) December

Monthly events

 Sutra copying, 14th (except July and August)
 Betsuji Nembutsu, 24th

Popular culture 

Zōjō-ji was depicted multiple times in the art work of the Shin hanga artist Kawase Hasui during the 1920s and 30s. It was also shown in several ukiyo-e prints by Hiroshige, in particular twice in his famous One Hundred Famous Views of Edo series from 1856–1858.

See also 
 Kenchū-ji in Nagoya
 Glossary of Japanese Buddhism

References

External links 

 Official site
The history of the Zojoji Temple

1390s establishments in Japan
1393 establishments in Asia
14th-century Buddhist temples
Buddhist temples in Tokyo
Buildings and structures in Japan destroyed during World War II
Buildings and structures in Minato, Tokyo
Important Cultural Properties of Japan
Pure Land temples